Kamal Shalorus (born 27 August 1972) is an Iranian-born British professional mixed martial artist who competed in the Lightweight division of ONE Championship. Shalorus a professional competitor since 2008. Has formerly competed for the UFC and the WEC.

Early life
Sahlorus was born in an isolated rural hut near the village of Khalkhal in  Ardabil Province on 27 August 1972.

Kamal is a wrestler, and he represented Great Britain in an Olympic Qualification tournament where he placed 8th.

He has also competed in grappling tournaments. He has a notable win over Joachim Hansen in the European Abu Dhabi Combat Club (ADCC) Qualifiers.

Mixed martial arts career
Kamal trains Brazilian Jiu Jitsu with WEC veteran and Relson Gracie Black Belt Phil Cardella. He has also had in-person training with Relson Gracie in Hawaii, in addition to 5x BJJ World Champ Daniel Moraes and Henry Akins. Kamal also trains in catch wrestling and MMA with Neil Melanson and Randy Couture at Xtreme Couture in Las Vegas. Kamal also hired Laren Umphlett, one of Karl Gotch's last students, to be a grappling coach at his gym Arte Training Center in Austin Texas.

Kamal is a partner in (and official grappling instructor for) the American Combat Association and he certifies MMA schools in his fighting system SICS and conducts seminars focused on catch wrestling through the ACA.

Kamal captured the welterweight title in the Austin Texas MMA promotion King of Kombat in April 2008, still undefeated. He then won the welterweight title in the Supreme Warrior Challenge, preparing his way into the WEC.

World Extreme Cagefighting
He was scheduled to make his WEC debut against Alex Karalexis on November 18, 2009 at WEC 44, but a broken hand forced Karalexis off the card. Karalexis was replaced by WEC newcomer Will Kerr. Shalorus defeated Kerr via TKO in the very first round.

Shalorus defeated previously unbeaten Dave Jansen via unanimous decision on January 10, 2010 at WEC 46. Shalorus showed impressive striking, takedown offense and defense. It was also noted, by Frank Mir, that Shalorus would be a force to be reckoned with in the future.

Shalorus was expected to face former WEC Lightweight Champion Jamie Varner on April 24, 2010 at WEC 48, but Shalorus was forced off of the card with an injury.  Varner/Shalorus took place on June 20, 2010 at WEC 49. The fight ended in a split draw (29–27 Varner, 29–27 Shalorus, and 28–28), with Shalorus being docked one point for multiple groin strikes.

Kamal Shalorus was expected to face Bart Palaszewski on November 11, 2010 at WEC 52, but the bout was moved to WEC 53 after Shalorus reinjured his hand that was broken during the bout with Varner. Shalorus won the fight via split decision (30–27, 28–29, and 29–28).

Ultimate Fighting Championship

In October 2010, World Extreme Cagefighting merged with the Ultimate Fighting Championship. As part of the merger, all WEC fighters were transferred to the UFC.  Shalorus was the third Iranian fighter to ever compete for the UFC; the other two being Reza Nasri, and Reza Madadi.

In his UFC debut, Shalorus faced Jim Miller on March 19, 2011 at UFC 128.  He lost the fight via TKO in the third round, the first loss of his professional career.

Shalorus next faced promotional newcomer and future UFC Lightweight Champion Khabib Nurmagomedov on January 20, 2012 at UFC on FX: Guillard vs. Miller.  He lost the fight via submission in the third round.

Shalorus faced Rafael dos Anjos on May 15, 2012 at UFC on Fuel TV: Korean Zombie vs. Poirier.  After being dropped with a head kick, Shalorus was submitted via rear naked choke in the first round and was subsequently released from the promotion.

ONE Fighting Championship

Nearly a year after being released from the UFC, Shalorus signed with the Asia's biggest MMA promotion, ONE FC promotion.  He made his promotional debut against Eduard Folayang at ONE Fighting Championship 9 on May 31, 2013 and won the fight via unanimous decision.

Kamal faced Ariel Sexton on March 14, 2014 at ONE Fighting Championship 14. He won the fight via unanimous decision.

Shalorus faced current champion Shinya Aoki on August 29, 2014 at ONE Fighting Championship 19. He lost the fight via submission in the first round.

Professional wrestling

On February 25, 2015 it was announced by the American Combat Association that Kamal is also beginning a career in a professional wrestling and is available for professional wrestling bookings

Mixed martial arts record

|-
|Loss
|align=center|9–5–2
|Ev Ting
|Decision (split)
|ONE: Throne of Tigers
|
|align=center|3
|align=center|5:00
|Kuala Lumpur, Malaysia
|
|-
|Loss
|align=center|9–4–2 
|Shinya Aoki
|Submission (rear-naked choke)
|ONE FC: Reign of Champions
|
|align=center|1
|align=center|2:15
|Dubai, UAE
|
|-
|Win
|align=center| 9–3–2 
|Ariel Sexton
|Decision (unanimous)
|ONE FC: War of Nations
| 
|align=center| 3
|align=center| 5:00
| Kuala Lumpur, Malaysia
|
|-
|Win
|align=center| 8–3–2 
|Eduard Folayang
|Decision (unanimous)
|ONE FC: Rise to Power
| 
|align=center| 3
|align=center| 5:00
| Pasay, Philippines
|
|-
| Loss
|align=center| 7–3–2
|Rafael dos Anjos
| Submission (rear-naked choke)
| UFC on Fuel TV: The Korean Zombie vs. Poirier
| 
|align=center| 1
|align=center| 1:40
|Fairfax, Virginia, United States
| 
|-
| Loss
|align=center| 7–2–2
|Khabib Nurmagomedov
| Submission (rear-naked choke)
| UFC on FX: Guillard vs. Miller
| 
|align=center| 3
|align=center| 2:08
|Nashville, Tennessee, United States
| 
|-
| Loss
|align=center| 7–1–2
|Jim Miller
| TKO (knee and punches)
| UFC 128
| 
|align=center| 3
|align=center| 2:15
|Newark, New Jersey, United States
| 
|-
| Win
|align=center| 7–0–2
|Bart Palaszewski
| Decision (split)
| WEC 53
| 
|align=center| 3
|align=center| 5:00
|Glendale, Arizona, United States
| 
|-
| Draw
|align=center| 6–0–2
|Jamie Varner
| Draw (split)
| WEC 49
| 
|align=center| 3
|align=center| 5:00
|Edmonton, Alberta, Canada
| 
|-
| Win
|align=center| 6–0–1
|Dave Jansen
| Decision (unanimous)
| WEC 46
| 
|align=center| 3
|align=center| 5:00
|Sacramento, California, United States
| 
|-
| Win
|align=center| 5–0–1
|Will Kerr
| TKO (punches)
| WEC 44
| 
|align=center| 1
|align=center| 1:26
|Las Vegas, Nevada, United States
| 
|-
| Win
|align=center| 4–0–1
|Justin Miller
| TKO (punches)
| Supreme Warrior Championship 7: Discountenance
| 
|align=center| 2
|align=center| 0:32
|Frisco, Texas, United States
| 
|-
| Draw
|align=center| 3–0–1
|Mike Bronzoulis
| Draw (majority)
| King of Kombat 6: Fists of Fury
| 
|align=center| 5
|align=center| 5:00
|Austin, Texas, United States
| 
|-
| Win
|align=center| 3–0
|Jonathan Evans
| TKO (punches)
| Extreme Challenge: War at the Shore
| 
|align=center| 1
|align=center| 0:35
|Atlantic City, New Jersey, United States
| 
|-
| Win
|align=center| 2–0
|Edwyn Jones
| Submission (rear-naked choke)
| Supreme Warrior Championship 2: Battlegrounds
| 
|align=center| 2
|align=center| 2:52
|Frisco, Texas, United States
| 
|-
| Win
|align=center| 1–0
|Jeff Davis
| TKO (punches)
| King of Kombat 3
| 
|align=center| 1
|align=center| 1:06
|Austin, Texas, United States
|

See also
 List of ONE Championship alumni

References

External links
Official UFC Profile

 Kamal Shalorus - UFC Fans

Living people
1972 births
English male mixed martial artists
Iranian male mixed martial artists
Lightweight mixed martial artists
Mixed martial artists utilizing catch wrestling
Mixed martial artists utilizing Brazilian jiu-jitsu
British male sport wrestlers
Iranian catch wrestlers
People from Khalkhal, Iran
Iranian emigrants to the United States
British people of Iranian descent
Iranian emigrants to the United Kingdom
Sportspeople of Iranian descent
Iranian practitioners of Brazilian jiu-jitsu
English practitioners of Brazilian jiu-jitsu
Ultimate Fighting Championship male fighters